The 1983–84 West Ham United F.C. season was West Ham's third in the First Division since their return at the end of the 1980–81 season. The club was managed by John Lyall and the team captain was Billy Bonds.

Season summary
The season started well for West Ham with them winning their first five games. They maintained good form until the end of 1983, when they were in third place in the league. They had not been lower than fifth place. A slump towards the end of the season saw them fall to their lowest place during the season, ninth place. Tony Cottee was the club's top scorer with 19 goals in all competitions. The next highest scorer was Dave Swindlehurst with 15. Steve Walford made the most appearances – 50 in all competitions. The season also saw the last game for West Ham by Trevor Brooking.

In the League Cup, West Ham recorded their biggest win in the competition when they beat Bury 10–0 in the second round second leg, to win the tie 12–1 on aggregate. The game was watched by only 10,896 people, the club's lowest home attendance for 30 years.

League table

Results
West Ham United's score comes first

Legend

Football League First Division

FA Cup

League Cup

Squad

References

West Ham United F.C. seasons
West Ham United
West Ham United
West Ham United